True Jackson, VP is an American teen sitcom created by Andy Gordon for Nickelodeon. It aired from November 8, 2008, to August 20, 2011. The series stars Keke Palmer, Ashley Argota, Matt Shively, Danielle Bisutti, Greg Proops, Robbie Amell, and Ron Butler. The theme song was written by Toby Gad and Keke Palmer and is performed by Palmer. The series was shot before a live audience, although a laugh track was used for sweetening. The pilot episode garnered 4.8 million viewers on its first airing and set network records among kids 6–11, tweens 9–14 and several other demographics. On May 5, 2009, Nickelodeon renewed the show for a second season. The season consisted of 34 episodes, which premiered on November 14, 2009. This season was later split, making a third season.

In August 2011, Palmer posted a video on her YouTube account and posted on her blog, confirming that "Mystery in Peru" is the series' finale. After the show ended, Palmer renewed her contract with the network; she did voiceover work for Nickelodeon's Winx Club and starred in the Nick TV movie Rags.

Premise
Fifteen-year-old True Jackson is selling sandwiches and lemonade with her friend Ryan in the fashion district of New York City, when she is complimented by fashion designer Max Madigan, founder and CEO of Mad Style. Max realizes the clothes True is wearing are his designs, but True had altered them to suit her own purposes. Max likes the altered design and hires True to be the Vice President of his fashion company's youth apparel division. True hires her best friend Lulu to be her assistant after firing Cricket, her former assistant, who was upset and bitter about being surpassed in the business world by a child. True must juggle teenage antics with her new role as VP, aided by her friends and coworkers.

Episodes

Cast

Main

 Keke Palmer as True Jackson, a teenager who serves as the Vice President of the Youth Fashion Department at Mad Style, where she works, and gets into mishaps and has a lot of fun with her friends. She is intelligent, funny and hardworking with an odd family. In the beginning of the series, she has a crush on Jimmy, Mr. Madigan's nephew, and they eventually become a couple. A running gag in the series is her catchphrase, "(you/she/he) (I/said/did) (there was) what now?".
 Ashley Argota as Lulu, True's best friend and secretary–assistant. She is loud, clueless, and easily distracted. Although not many people believe it, she is very intelligent and loves math. She also suffers from trichophagia and is also afraid of birds (as she mentions to True in one episode, "They give me the creeps but I'm not sure why"). Her last name was not revealed during the series. She has a boyfriend named Mikey J.
 Matt Shively as Ryan Leslie Laserbeam, True's second best friend. Though he does not have an official job at Mad Style, he is always there to hang and help out with True and Lulu. He is not very intelligent and is very clumsy. Ryan's middle name is Leslie, but he dislikes it. Oscar is not sure if Laserbeam is Ryan's real last name, but according to Ryan's big brother, he got the name when one of his ancestors was given the name "Laserbeam" by his crew captain while he was working on a ship. Max makes him the website editor in one episode.
 Danielle Bisutti as Amanda Cantwell, one of the many workers at Mad Style. She is the Vice President of Women's Fashion. At the beginning of the series, Amanda dislikes True and often disagrees with her, embittered by True's seniority within the company despite her youth. Over time, Amanda becomes close with True and her friends.
 Robbie Amell as Jimmy Madigan, a mail deliverer at Mad Style, the nephew of Max Madigan, and the boy of True's affection. The two are affectionate towards one another, and eventually enter a relationship.
 Ron Butler as Oscar, the main secretary and operator for Mad Style, and works behind the reception desk on the floor where Mad Style offices are. He is seen taking calls on his headset or delivering messages to Amanda. Known for his style and dry humour, he is flamboyant. He wears ascots all the time.
 Greg Proops as Max Madigan, the eccentric CEO of Mad Style, Jimmy's uncle, and True’s boss. Max often glorifies True, and rarely criticizes her.

Recurring
 Dan Kopelman as Kopelman, a Mad Style employee who hardly speaks and is frequently ridiculed by Max.
 Jennette McCurdy as Amanda "Pinky" Turzo, True's archnemesis.
 Trevor Brown as Mikey J, Lulu's boyfriend.
 Jordan Monaghan as Kelsey, Ryan's on-and-off girlfriend.
 Joy Osmanski as Ms. Patti Park, True's teacher.
 Melanie Paxson as Doris Madigan (née Aidem), Max Madigan's capricious wife and True's school librarian.
 Taylor Parks as Shelly, one of True's friends.
 Vincent Ventresca as Mr. Jeff Jamerson, True's science teacher.
 Jo-Anne Krupa as Ella, the Mad Style accountant.

Guest stars

 Pamela Adlon as Babs, a 40-something high school student.
 Dave Allen as Mitchell, copy room operator
 Craig Anton as Snackleberry Junction chef.
 Tim Bagley as Ed Wheeler, True's driving instructor.
 Natasha Bedingfield as herself.
 Justin Bieber as himself.
 Jordan Black as Uncle Troy.
 Samantha Boscarino as Carla Gustav.
 Julie Bowen as Claire Underwood, an unlikeable assistant of Amanda’s.
 Laura Ashley Samuels as Bijou Stinkbottom.
 Yvette Nicole Brown as Coral Barns, one of Amanda's assistants.
 Care Bears on Fire as Themselves.
 John Cena as himself.
 Noah Crawford as Stan, a teen who works at All Things Lemon.
 Allie DeBerry as Cammy, Pinky's friend.
 Fefe Dobson as herself.
 Julia Duffy as Ms. Watson.
 Stephen Dunham as Chad Brackett, Amanda's ex-boyfriend.
 Tiffany Espensen as Young Lulu.
 Kevin Farley as Officer Jake Hooley.
 Dave Foley as Ted Begley, Jr., company retreat mediator.
 Vivica A. Fox as True's mother.
 Gage Golightly as Vanessa, a runaway disguised as a flight attendant.
 Ian Gomez as Jobi Castanueva, the director of Fashion week.
 Kelli Goss as Monique.
 Philip Baker Hall as Mr. Jenkins, chairman of an airline company.
 Rachael Harris as Kitty Monreaux, a scathing red carpet reporter.
 Henry Hereford as Ryan's great-grandfather.
 David Anthony Higgins as Dave, one of Amanda's assistants.
 Victoria Justice as Vivian, a model who dates Jimmy.
 Richard Karn as Fire Marshal O'Dannon.
 Tom Kenny as Bingo, owner of Snackleberry Junction.
 Nathan Kress as Prince Gabriel.
 Emma Lockhart as Callie, a girl True hires to run a Mad Style store.
 Wendie Malick as Libby Gibbils, Max's fellow fashion colleague.
 J. P. Manoux as Snackleberry Junction waiter.
 Laura Marano as Molly.
 Tristin Mays as Hailey, a cheerleader.
 Cymphonique Miller as Bernie, Ryan's rival magician.
 Oliver Muirhead as Ian, Prince Gabriel's butler.
 Arden Myrin as Jenna Lutrell, a popular but ditzy TV actress.
 Suzy Nakamura as Cricket, True's former assistant.
 Gail O'Grady as Sophie Girard, Max's very mean ex-girlfriend.
 Nick Palatas as Skeet.
 Janel Parrish as Kyla.
 Kelly Perine as Larry Jackson, True's father.
 Jack Plotnick as Matsor LaRue, the wedding planner for Max's wedding.
 Nathalia Ramos as Dakota North, a spoiled supermodel.
 Italia Ricci as herself, playing a character in a fictional John Cena film.
 Andy Richter as Simon Christini, Max's fashion nemesis.
 Raini Rodriguez as Nina.
 Travis Schuldt as Lance Whipple, a hunky librarian.
 Kent Shocknek as himself.
 Ryan Sheckler as himself.
 Willow Smith as Young True.
 Stefán Karl Stefánsson as Karl Gustav.
 French Stewart as Donald the Delightful, Max's magic assistant turned rival.
 James Patrick Stuart as Burt Burlington, a television personality who embarrassed Max on television.
 Nicole Sullivan as Kreuftlva, a fortune teller.
 Sharon Tay as herself.
 Leon Thomas III as himself.
 Bobb'e J. Thompson as Nate.
 Stephen Tobolowsky as Lars Balthazar, a famous cellist.
 Paul F. Tompkins as Royce Bingham, an international spy.
 Julie Warner as Rose Pinchbinder, Mad Style's fear-inducing accountant.
 Michael Weaver as Brock Champion.
 Tyler James Williams as Justin Webber, a famous rapper and True’s crush.
 Tom Wilson as Benjamin Franklin.
 The cast of Yo Gabba Gabba!

Production
The series was shot on stage 25 at Paramount Studios in Hollywood, California. This is the same stage where series The Lucy Show, Here's Lucy, Cheers, and Frasier were shot.

Filming locations
 The indoor recording of Mad Style took place in the studio at stage 25 of Paramount Studios in Hollywood. The outdoor shots of Mad Style's fashion company and office took place around 1251 Avenue of the Americas (Exxon Building) in New York.
 The location of the school is on the premises of the Paramount Studios. Indoors were shot in the studio, and the school's outdoor shot was shot on the premises of Paramount Studios.
 In episode four of season 2, True goes to see a fortune teller with Lulu and Ryan. The indoor recordings were recorded in the studio. The outdoor shot was shot at 178 Prince Street in New York.

Gallery

Broadcast
The series has aired on-and-off on TeenNick in the United States since 2008, with the most recent airing in 2020. BET also briefly aired episodes of the series in 2009.

The show also premiered on the Canadian network YTV on March 5, 2009 and every Thursday since, but was changed to Friday to accommodate with iCarly & Big Fun Fridays. Then, the show moved again to Mondays at 6:30pm. As of 2010, the series no longer airs on YTV.

The series continues to air regularly on Nickelodeon networks around the world. The show ended in Australia and New Zealand on 17 December 2011. The last two remaining episodes premiered in the UK on Wednesday 4 January 2012 and Thursday 5 January 2012 and with "Mystery in Peru" premiering on Friday 6 January 2012.

The series is currently shown in Jamaica on one of the national stations TVJ (Television Jamaica) at 4:30pm on Tuesdays and Wednesdays.

On May 1, 2019, the series began airing on Nick Pluto.

Home media
True Jackson, VP: Season 1, Vol. 1 was released in a 2 disc set on September 8, 2009. Running time is 321 minutes, presented in full screen video, and English stereo audio. The set also includes behind-the-scenes, cast member's screen tests, bloopers and the first 13 episodes of season 1. Even though there is Season 1 Volume 1, for unknown reasons, a Volume 2 was never released.

The following releases were only released on Amazon.com's CreateSpace manufacture-on-demand (MOD) service:
True Jackson, VP: Season 2 was released on September 9, 2011. Running time is 468 minutes, presented in full screen video, and English Stereo audio. This DVD release has 20 episodes from the second season.

True Jackson, VP: Season 3 was released on September 9, 2011. Running time is 327 minutes, presented in full screen video, and English Stereo audio. This DVD release has 14 episodes from the third season.

On March 24, 2021, the series was added to Paramount+.

Awards and nominations

Merchandise and in other media

Clothing line
In August 2009, a line of clothing inspired by the show called "Mad Style by True Jackson" was released. The line was available exclusively at Walmart and is aimed at children and teens. This was the first line of clothing for the show and was a first for Nickelodeon releasing a line of clothing from one of their television shows. Commercials advertising the clothing line can be seen on Nickelodeon and TeenNick. Featured in the show and commercials is an instrumental version of the show's theme song.

Book series
A set of novels based on the show were released, via Amazon.

Notes

References

External links

 

2000s American black sitcoms
2000s American teen sitcoms
2000s American workplace comedy television series
2000s Nickelodeon original programming
2008 American television series debuts
2010s American black sitcoms
2010s American teen sitcoms
2010s American workplace comedy television series
2010s Nickelodeon original programming
2011 American television series endings
English-language television shows
Fashion-themed television series
Television series about teenagers
Television shows filmed in Los Angeles
Television shows set in New York City